Kinematic diffraction is the approach to study diffraction phenomena by neglecting multiple scattering. For linear wave equations, it thus consists in summing the contribution of the partial waves emanating from the different scatterers, where only the incident field drives the scattering. As a consequence, the far-field amplitude essentially corresponds to the Fourier transform of the scattering length density. It is typically understood as the Born approximation applied to a regular arrangement of scatterers, as appropriate for X-ray crystallography. The corresponding full (non-perturbative) theory is called the dynamical theory of diffraction.

References

Diffraction